Roberto Eduardo Biagio Borgatta y Ruiz (1921–2009), known professionally as Robert Edward Borgatta, was an American artist and foremost a nature painter whose style evolved from abstractions and later became more representational.

Childhood

Robert was born in Havana, Cuba and had a peripatetic childhood.  His father, Carlos Borgatta, worked for Marconi Communications as a communications engineer, designing and installing telegraph systems throughout Latin America (Cuba, Brazil, Mexico and Argentina). Robert's father was of Northern Italian and Mexican Indian descent, fluent in both Spanish and Italian, and an Italian citizen. He worked with David Sarnoff at Marconi Communications and Sarnoff would then later found RCA. Prior to the outbreak of WWII when Italy became allied with Germany, Sarnoff offered Carlos a job at RCA and facilitated the visas for his immediate family to immigrate to the US from Italy.

Onorio Ruotolo of the Leonardo da Vinci Art School in New York recognized Robert's talents as a child painter and accepted him as the youngest student in the school at nine years of age.  Robert traveled alone daily to the school via the elevated subway from Maspeth, Queens then back home nine hours later. Carlos located the school through his acquaintance with Ruotolo, also from northern Italy. The School emphasized traditional European art training with extensive time spent drawing life size plaster casts of classical Greco Roman sculptures and extensive instruction on human anatomy. Robert was trained as Italian artists are trained as in the tradition of the Renaissance, where emphasis is first placed on drawing from classical Greek and Roman sculpture, before graduating to life model drawing and the study of perspective and then on to art history.

The School marked Robert's introduction to and lifelong admiration of Vesalius' anatomical drawings, and he would return to this reference book throughout his career, especially when he was sculpting.  At the school, Robert developed a friendship with the sculptor Isamu Noguchi and the two maintained contact for many years thereafter. Noguchi had a long relationship with the School and like Robert, was a favorite of Ruotolo. Also like Robert, Noguchi was obviously very different and stood apart from the other teachers and students: he was Japanese American and the oldest teacher at the time, Robert was the youngest student and still learning English.  Noguchi enabled "Robbie" to attend the life drawing classes where subjects were nude models. (Robert's young age was the reason he wasn't allowed in these classes—the older students found his advanced skill level upsetting.). Robert attended life modeling classes throughout his career and found the experience of life drawing an important resource that helped him resolve technical issues when developing new works.

In 1931 at the age of eleven, Robert was a recipient of a Wannamaker Prize bestowed upon the best child artist in New York City. The individual prizes were commemorative medals in the likeness of Rutherford B. Hayes the nineteenth President of the United States. This was one of his most cherished possessions and he carried it with him as an army intelligence officer during World War II.

Education 
Leonardo da Vinci School, (1930 - 1938)

New York University School of Architecture and Allied Arts. Bachelor of Fine Arts, magna cum laude, 1940

Yale University School of Art, MFA, 1942

Robert received his bachelor's degree from New York University School of Architecture and Allied Arts graduating magna cum laude in 1940, and a Masters of Fine Arts from Yale University School of Fine Arts in 1942. His masters thesis was on the Italian painter and sculptor Modigliani.

Robert was working on abstractions, portraits, cityscapes and representational works simultaneously during his years as a student at NYU and Yale.

Military service 
United States Army Rangers, Military Intelligence (1943-1946)

In September 1945 as an officer in U.S. Army Intelligence, Master Sergeant Robert Borgatta (along with Corporal Nunzio Barbaro of Brooklyn and Lester J. McDonnell of Cleveland, Ohio) testified in the trial of Rita Louisa Zucca also known as “Axis Sally.” Zucca who had renounced her American citizenship in 1941 was broadcasting Nazi propaganda to U.S. troops in the Mediterranean. The tribunal would sentence her to four years for conspiring with the enemy with the intent of demoralizing U.S. soldiers. Robert was also featured again on the front page of the Times for a more light-hearted piece regarding his liberation of a small Italian village.  The Office of Strategic Services (OSS) was a precursor to the CIA and Robert performed his duties through his Army Rangers attachment as an interrogator of Axis prisoners in Italy and North Africa. His fluency in five languages: French, Spanish, Italian, German and English, along with charm and presence, made him an effective interrogator. Despite these skills and his college degree, he refused officer commissions and stayed at the rank of Master Sergeant. His first hand experiences at Monte Cassino changed him into a lifelong pacifist and an anti-war activist during the Viet Nam era.

Early career 
Robert had returned to New York a World War II veteran having spent three years overseas (1943–46), and prior to that having completed his MFA at Yale (1942). His paintings in this period are mostly moody, dense urban landscapes and abstractions.

Upon his return, Robert received an important commission from the prizefighter Joe Louis to produce a mural for Joe Louis’ nightclub and restaurant in Harlem: a fifty by eight foot mural (400 sq. ft.) depicting black contributions to American culture. Among the historic figures he portrayed were Booker T. Washington, Dr. George Washington Carver, Paul Robeson, Bill “Bojangles” Robinson and Marian Anderson. Robert's objective was to “represent most of the distinguished black personalities in American history”. Joe Louis was also a war veteran and like Robert, an outsider in America.  They were to remain lifelong friends. A wonderful Times Magazine photo shows Robert visiting Joe in the hospital, shortly before his announced retirement from his boxing career.

1940-1960—Waterscapes 

The waterscapes form a large collection ranging from the abstract to impressionistic. Promontories and the meeting of the land and sea are prevalent themes, and perspective takes on a full range of expression.

1940-1960—Landscapes 
An extensive collection, the landscapes include alpine scenes, cliffs, ravines and the Palisades. There are numerous panoramic paintings, including ‘From St. Michaels’, ‘Andalusia’ and ‘038’. These works were produced completely from sketches and recalled visits.

1970's 
For the first half of his life, Robert craved being American with a capital A: acceptance, admiration, acquiring things, and ambition. This was reflected in his position as a young tenured professor, the large number of solo gallery exhibitions, executing mural commissions, and advertising graphics work. His ability to routinely sell his work, coupled with his salary as an art professor and other art-related income was a source of pride that he made his living and supported his family solely as an artist.  Robert was also instrumental in obtaining jobs for his peers including Phillip Pearlstein among others.

Robert served on the board of directors of the National Society of Painters of Casein and was affiliated with the National Arts Club

Mid to later works

1970-1980—Creation Series 

The Creation Series marked departures in previous painting styles. During this period, he was sculpting simultaneously while painting. Similar to the Babcock disapproving of his evolving away from genres they preferred, years earlier John Canaday the art critic voiced similar frustration is several of his reviews of Robert's works. The issue of being pigeon-holed irked Robert and the dictum that one could only be defined as a painter for one style was not acceptable to him. Continuing to venture into new genres, he created during the early seventies “slide triptychs” where each panel of a painting would represent a greater magnification of his subject. In the egg and slide triptychs, the preliminary studies or smaller works would contain more depth of detail then the larger final works. The smaller water colors completed his output during this period.

These significant changes in the direction of his work in terms of his paintings and his new direction into sculpting caused Robert's falling out with the Babcock Galleries—they would not show his sculpture because he was associated with their gallery as a painter and they wouldn't show the new creation paintings because these were too different from the mystical, moody abstractions and landscapes he was known for. Although he missed exhibiting, separating from the Babcock Galleries freed him from producing with exhibitions and sales in mind and coincided with a new direction in his work, one that proved ultimately more introspection and brought him great personal satisfaction. A counterbalance to reduced exhibiting was the ability to work as he wished.

1975-1985—Sculpture 

During this period, Robert began sculpting (stone carving, mostly marble) and also painting what he later termed Egg Paintings, which became part of his Creation Series of paintings.

1990-2000—Waterscapes 

These waterscapes show a marked departure in style and content from the waterscapes during the 1940-1960 period. Gardens and natural parks like the Everglades were subject matters and numerous photographs from 1990-2010 Photographic Studies for Paintings were used to plan these works.

1980-1990—Wilderness Series 
The charcoal drawings, flower paintings and close-ups of bodies of water and plants are his latest works and have never been exhibited. At least twenty of these paintings were sold from his studio to private collectors. Robert concentrated the latter part of his life on producing works rather than exhibiting. His painting subjects came from the national parks and gardens he visited, and he approached these works as portraits rather than landscapes. The water paintings and paintings of grasses were his personal favorites—he liked best what seemed chaotic or unorganized and then finding reason, patterns and rhythms, from a scene viewed at a park or garden.

The charcoal drawings would become the “Wilderness Series” and the themes and forms of these drawings found their way into the paintings. Robert would use turpentine to wet the paper and with a palette knife would then work with this wet medium, creating the image from the black liquid mass. (This technique was borne from an accident when he had spilled turpentine on a charcoal drawing he had been working on.) Once it dried, he would create the drawing by erasing light out of the charcoal mass. Attention to the negative spaces in a composition was a favorite theme in all of his works across media.

2000-2010—Flower Portraits 
He read Blake's Auguries of Innocence and felt this poem best expressed his world view, to see heaven in a wildflower. The flowers and waterscapes from the second half of his career become more representational and are from the most prosaic locations (local gardens, first in New York then Florida). Robert took great delight when viewers of his work were surprised that the subject matter was a subway ride away or around the corner. The ability to go back and see a subject he was painting at different times in different lights and also, to see the flowers and plants go through death and come alive again in the next year enchanted him. For his entire life, Robert had been an inveterate traveler. As the physical aspects of travel became too laborious, his pragmatism refocused him in his immediate surroundings for subject matter.

1990-2010—Photographs 

These photographic studies were used to plan the later waterscapes

Influences 
In sculpture, Robert greatly admired and was influenced by the styles of Henry Moore, Barbara Hepworth, and the Cycladic period of art in Greece, as well as Constantin Brancusi and Giacometti, as he was to favor pure, essential forms.  He often said that he would trade all of his possessions for the Benin court ivory mask at the Metropolitan Museum of Art.

Robert often referred to anatomical drawings by Vesalius when composing his works, and the themes of bones and muscles were characteristic of his sculpture. His sculpture is mindful of negative space or a minimalist perspective and this theme is pervasive in compositions in his landscapes and later flower paintings. Cézanne’s use of perspective in composition to draw the viewer through the journey of the painting was a great influence on Robert's landscape painting technique.
In painting, he admired and studied a wide range of artists. The murals of the Renaissance were constant lessons in composition that he revisited because of their skill in combining large scale work that kept the viewer engaged and the eye moving. Of this period, he greatly admired Tintoretto, Michelangelo and Raphael. Of Michelangelo, he thought of his unfinished Pieta as the most perfect expression of love and empathy, and as a technical achievement in the ability to see the evidence of the artist's journey in his chisel marks.

He took many trips to Italy and Venice to see the Scuola Grande di San Rocco murals by Tintoretto. It was frequently closed for various reasons, and it took five years of visits before he could view the entire works. This was the most intimate, mysterious way to experience murals; unlike other great mural works, the scuola San Rocco is hard to find, is always dim light at best, but the viewer is rewarded with a spectacular narrative of Christ's life. For Robert, this was Christ painted to be accessible by Everyman. This is how he interpreted the somewhat less finished aspect of these murals. Tintoretto, like Robert and like Modigliani were outsiders.

His all around favorite painter in terms of skill, vision and humanism was Turner who was for landscapes as Rembrandt was for portraits.  Rembrandt self portrait represented for Robert what his goals were as an artist: first an unflinching representation of what was beautiful in painting, and as with Michelangelo the hand of the artist is evident in the brush strokes as well as the thought process. Robert made museum guards very nervous in always going as close to a work as he could to see details of the work. Van der Weyden's Portrait of a Lady was the first work he would look for at the National Gallery, and thought the work transcended portraiture.  Hiroshige and his multiple views and perspectives influenced Robert in his preliminary studies for painting.

Chinese landscape drawings were a constant source of inspiration. He was most drawn by the synthesis of the artist's internal monologue and the depiction of the subject, and these were great examples of spiritual and intellectual unity. A very happy day for him came when the Met opened the Brook Astor Chinese court.

Robert Mapplethorpe and Andy Warhol were, for Robert, highly original and always compelling. In particular, Mapplethorpe's images of decaying flowers were of great interest, the idea that decaying dying things could be so beautiful, so spiritual. Regarding Warhol, early on Robert thought Warhol was important and original and made a point of keeping up with his work.

Robert had an enormous range as an artist and mastered the technical aspects of many media. He loved the challenge of mastering a particular style and the intellectual skills brought to bear. His classical training and art history studies gave him an extensive artistic vocabulary that allowed him to articulate his visions.

Technical Virtuosity 
Relative to his peers, Robert seldom employed studio assistants and when he did, for limited purposes. He was well versed on technical aspects of creating art and he stretched and primed his own canvases and mixed his paints from dry pigment. He worked primarily in oil for painting and charcoal for drawings. In addition to his oil and acrylic paintings, Robert's works in pastel, water color, tempera and wood canvas are still in excellent un-restored condition. The same holds true for his approach to sculpture; works are mostly in marble and granite and small figures in jade and serpentine. He would begin a painting with gesture drawings, blocking out the large movements and composition. Paintings started as cartoons, followed by the primer color which was often cerulean—the base color beneath the snapdragons, or alizarin crimson for the gladioli.

Exhibition history

One-man exhibitions 
 Village Art Center, N.Y. 1953
 Wellons Gallery, N.Y. 1954
 City College, N.Y. 1958, 1964
 Hudson River Museum, Yonkers, N.Y. 1960
 Ringwood Museum, N.J. 1966, 1972
 Park College, Kansas City, MO. 1970
 Babcock Galleries, N.Y. 1964, 1968, 1970
Southern Vermont Arts Center 1977
 Fine Arts Gallery, Harmon, N.Y. 1979

Select group exhibitions 
 Weyhe Gallery, N.Y. 1945
 Roko Gallery, N.Y. 1950, 1979
 Associated Gallery of Art, Detroit, MI. 1955
 Riverside Museum 1956, 1958, 1960
 Schettini Gallery, Milan, Italy 1957
 New School, N.Y. 1958
 Glassboro College, N.J. 1961
 M.I.T., Cambridge, MA. 1962
 Corcoran Gallery, Washington 1966, 1968, 1970
 Whitney Museum 1954, 1966, 1968
 Museum of Modern Art (Penthouse) 1968
 Pennsylvania Academy 1957
 Loeb Center, N.Y.U. 1965, 1968
 Mansfield State College 1972
 Hudson River Museum 1972, 1974
 Bass Museum of Art, 1964

Collections 
 Chrysler Museum, Norfolk, VA
 Ford Foundation
 Yale University Art Gallery
 Mansfield State College
 Standard Motors Products Corporation
 Connecticut Mutual Life Insurance Co.
 Miller Associates
 Globus Travel, US Headquarters, Colorado
 Pfizer corporate art collection

Grants and awards 
 Tiffany Fellowship 1942
 Emily Lowe Foundation 1957
 MacDowell Colony Fellowship 1972, 1973
 Silvermine Guild 1954, 1958
 Audubon Artist Annuals 1955, 1958, 1969
 American Watercolor Society 1961, 1962
 National Society Painters In Casein and Acrylic 1961, 1970

Plein Air Painting 
 Robert Borgatta Waterscapes

1921 births
2009 deaths
American artists
Cuban emigrants to the United States